This article covers the 2017–18 season for Vllaznia Shkodër. They participate in the Kategoria Superiore.

Current squad

Reserve team

Competitions

Kategoria Superiore

League table

Results summary

Results by round

References

Vllaznia Shkodër
KF Vllaznia Shkodër seasons